Oedaleus flavus is a species of insect belonging to the family Acrididae.

It is native to Africa.

References

Acrididae